The 1996 European Parliament election in Finland was the first election of the Finnish delegation to the European Parliament.

Background
In 1996, Finland had a population of 5.1 million (4.1 million voters). The government was a broad coalition led by the social democrat Paavo Lipponen. The governing coalition consisted of: the Social Democrats (SDP), The National Coalition Party (Kokoomus), the Left Alliance (Vasemmistoliitto), The Swedish People's Party (RKP) and the Greens (Vihreä liitto).

Composition before election
 ELDR Group (6): Elisabeth REHN, Mirja RYYNÄNEN*, Olli Ilmari REHN*, Paavo VÄYRYNEN*, Seppo PELTTARI, Timo Juhani JÄRVILAHTI.
 PES Group (4): Mikko RÖNNHOLM*, Riitta MYLLER*, Saara-Maria PAAKKINEN, Ulpu IIVARI*.
 EPP Group (4): Pirjo RUSANEN*, Riitta JOUPPILA*, Ritva Tellervo LAURILA*, Kyösti TOIVONEN*
 EUL/NGL Group (1): Marjatta STENIUS-KAUKONEN.
 Green Group (1): Heidi HAUTALA*.

An asterisk (*) indicates Members standing for re-election.

Electoral system
All Finnish citizens that were 18 years old on the election day at the latest, were eligible to vote. They did not have to register as it was done automatically by the authorities. Other citizens of the European Union who had a domicile in Finland on 30 August 1996 were eligible to vote, although they had to register as voters in Finland and confirm that they did not vote in any other Member State during the elections in 1994 and 1995, and would not vote in Austria in 1996.

According to the Finnish Population Register Center (Väestrekisterikeskus) there were at the end of August 1996 some 72600 foreigners living in Finland. Biggest national groups willing to vote were the Swedes, the Germans and the British. The final date for the registration was 15 August 1996.

In June Väestrekisterikeskus approached with an official letter all the EU nationals living in Finland. The letter was in Finnish, Swedish, English, French and German.

In the European elections candidates could be nominated by the registered political parties and citizens' groups. The parties could do the nomination automatically. The other groups had to gather supporting signatures for each of their candidates from each of the four election districts i.e. each candidate must have had 4 x 1000 supporting signatures. This meant that a non-party organization wanting to nominate the maximum number (16) of candidates had to collect 64000 signatures altogether.

The parties and other groups could choose between two different systems. They could nominate candidates for the whole country or for a region. For the elections Finland was divided into four districts. However, all the parties nominated candidates for the whole country.

The deadline for the parties and other organizations to put forward candidates was 19 September 1996. There were 14 parties and one other organization in the elections. The total number of candidates was 207.

Parties running in the election

Parties represented in the EP
 SDP : The Finnish Social Democratic Party
 Keskusta: Finnish Center Party
 Kokoomus: The National Coalition Party
 Vasemmistoliitto: The Left Alliance
 RKP/SFP: The Swedish People's Party
 Vihreät: The Greens

Parties not represented in the EP
 SKL/Kristillinen liitto: Finnish Christian Union
 PS/Perussuomalaiset: True Finns
 NUSU/Nuorsuomalaiset: Young Finns
 Liberaalinen Kansanpuolue: Liberal Party
 Suomen Eläkeläisten Puolue: Pensioners
 Luonnonlain Puolue: Law of Nature
 Vaihtoehto EU:Lle: Anti-EU Movement

Results

References

Finland
European Parliament elections in Finland
European Parliament
Finland